Currently known as Mitsubishi Electric Hydronics & IT Cooling Systems S.p.A., DeLclima is an Italian company  designing and producing HVAC and HPAC units through Climaveneta and RC GROUP. DeLclima also operates in the radiator business through DL Radiators.

History and trading 
The company, headquartered in Treviso, was established in 2012 as a demerger from De'Longhi. DeLclima was listed on the Milan Stock Exchange from 2012 until February 2016, when it was delisted following the acquisition by Mitsubishi Electric at the end of 2015. Climaveneta, RC Group, and DeLclima Finance merged into Mitsubishi Electric Hydronics & IT Cooling Systems S.p.A. as of January 1st, 2017. The new company also integrated the entire staff of MELCO Hydronics and IT Cooling S.p.A., the former corporate operational entity, previously known as DeLclima S.p.A. 

DeLclima companies shared the mission of increasing well-being and industrial productivity by providing high efficiency and eco-sustainable solutions, in particular by embracing renewable energy sources. 
DeLclima manufactures in three continents and operates worldwide with subsidiaries, distributors and service companies, with particular focus in Europe, China and India.

References

External links 
 

Companies listed on the Borsa Italiana
Heating, ventilation, and air conditioning companies
Engineering companies of Italy
Italian companies established in 2012
Italian brands
Companies of Italy
Companies based in Veneto
Companies based in Treviso